Singapore 2006 was a group of several concurrent events that were held in Singapore in support of the 61st Annual Meetings of the Boards of Governors of the International Monetary Fund and the World Bank Group. The opening ceremony and plenary sessions for the main meetings took place from 19–20 September 2006 at the Suntec Singapore International Convention and Exhibition Centre (SSICEC) in Marina Centre. The ministers of G8, G10 and G24 coincided with the event on 16 September. Registration for event delegates began on 11 September 2006 at City Hall, and the three-day Program of Seminars from 16 September 2006 at the Pan Pacific Singapore. Other concurrent events that were held at various venues include the Singapore Biennale 2006 (4 September – 12 November), the Raffles Forum 2006 (14–15 September), Indonesia Day (17 September) and the Global Emerging Markets Investors Forum and Networking Reception (18 September).

Event organisers expected a turnout of about 16,000 delegates and observers, but saw a record 23,000 delegates and 300 finance ministers registering themselves, the largest turnout for an overseas annual meeting. It is the largest meeting in Singapore's history, and other meetings include the 117th IOC Session and the WTO Ministerial Conference 1996. The meeting's key focus was to improve the lives of the people in developing nations, with many member nations calling for a louder voice, especially for developing countries. Dominating issues include quotas and voting rights in the IMF, in turn decides on the policies on the prevention and management of financial crises. The event ended with the main achievement being the reform of the IMF system, the main topics were the prospects of and the risk of the global economy.

Emblem

The emblem for the 2006 annual meetings of the IMF and the World Bank Group is gold in colour, with lines and a bud in the emblem. Gold is selected for the emblem as it relates to the financial sector and the country's contributions to the world economy. It exemplifies excellence and strength, which characterise Singapore as a regional business and financial centre. The tones point towards the increase in the wealth of the nations, with expanding richness and scope for the people. The bud may appear to represent the plurality of ideas and cultures at the event. It also symbolises the life in the city-state, that brings forth its potential for growth in the global market. With its curve, the spine depicts the horizon of the world. The stylised lines are the longitudes, to represent the connection of countries and world leaders at the annual meetings. Petals are to signify the unity of leaders to have a common goal at the meetings. The lines also depict the congruent roles countries have to achieve international cooperation for growth in the world.

Preparations

On 30 September 2002, Lim Hng Kiang who was then the Second Minister for Finance, Minister for Health and the Deputy Chairman for the Monetary Authority of Singapore, announced Singapore as the host of the annual meetings for 2006. The Memorandum of Understanding was signed on 23 September 2003 at Dubai International Convention Centre by Lim, International Monetary Fund managing director Horst Köhler, and president of the World Bank Group James Wolfensohn.

Venue and logistics
Pico Art International, a local event marketing corporation, was assigned to prepare the event venue. Pico had participated in major past events such as the 117th IOC Session, 2006 Commonwealth Games and the 2004 Summer Olympics. They built over a thousand double storey offices in 35 days, or three office units per hour. The structures within the convention centre were taken down nine days after the meetings. These double storey offices were air-conditioned, equipped with lighting, telephones and internet connection. It had 41 staircases and five elevators. One thousand tons of steel, over 100,000 pieces of wall panels, 25,000 m² of carpeting, 32,000 pieces of ceiling boards, 3,000 lights and 15,000 pieces of furniture were needed for the construction of these offices.

The main venue, Suntec Singapore International Convention and Exhibition Centre, received a facelift with an upgraded lobby, entrance and a facade which was lighted at night. 100,000 flowers and shrubs were used to beautify the landscape around the area as well as other parts of the island, including Orchard Road, Suntec's vicinity as well as the East Coast Parkway. These plants included frangipani trees, fox palms and heliconias, as well as other types of plants, coming in different colours, shapes and sizes, planted along pavements and road dividers. This showcased the tropical plants of the island to the world as well. Flyovers and the City Hall undergone repainting and works to repave the areas near Suntec City were pushed forward to prepare for the annual meetings. Also, walkways have been resurfaced by the Land Transport Authority. At Singapore Changi Airport, posters were put around the terminals of the airport to welcome the delegates from different countries.

Publicity

A campaign known as Four Million Smiles was launched in July 2006 by Prime Minister Lee Hsien Loong to prepare the service sector for the event. Lim Hwee Hwa is the Minister appointed to lead the Organising Committee of the event.

Security
As Singapore had been a prime terrorism target and because of violent protests at previous meets in other cities, the government used this to justify maintaining overwhelming amounts of security in and around the vicinity of the main events. The Singapore Police Force was entrusted with planning and implementing security arrangements and the enforcement of law and order, with the support of Aetos and CISCO auxiliary police forces. These arrangements include the main venue's operations, border security, as well as island-wide operations.

Over 10,000 police officers are being deployed in the Marina Centre area and other meeting and event venues, including Police national servicemen called back as part of their reservist obligations and officers from the Volunteer Special Constabulary. The traffic police deployed officers at all key junctions to direct traffic due to road closures, officers from the Gurkha Contingent and the Key Installation Protection Unit conduct patrols around the vicinity and at entrances to the barricaded areas, while regular officers ensure law and order within the convention venue and in surrounding hotels.

Security is exceptionally tight in the Suntec City area, with barricades being put up near the area's vicinity. The Suntec Singapore International Convention and Exhibition Centre has been closed to public during this period, and several car park entrances to the mall have been closed to the public. During the event, Suntec City and the convention centre is being taken care of by the Singapore Police Force and CISCO Security, with many policemen patrolling the mall and the convention centre. Vehicle checks are done by the police when they enter the carparks. The overhead bridge from CityLink Mall to Suntec City has been closed to the public for the meetings. A security office has been temporarily built at the main entrance of Suntec City Mall with metal detectors and x-ray machines being installed, and other security facilities. These machines have also been installed at SICEC for the delegates and CSO protestors.

Pre-meetings events
Road closures in the vicinity of the event venues came into effect on the night of 10 September 2006, with police presence increased substantially within SICEC and in adjoining hotels. There was a notable drop in traffic volume around the area even during the morning peak hours, and traffic remained relatively smooth. Meeting delegates commenced officially at City Hall on 11 September 2006, 0800 hours (SST). There was a lack of taxis in Marina Centre, and booking a taxi was slow, and long queues at taxi stands were seen. The road diversion has caused Marina Mandarin Singapore to get its porters to flag taxis from the main road. Taxi companies reported no increase in taxi bookings in the area. However, at Singapore Changi Airport cabbies had complained the wait of the delegates have been long. Taxi operator Comfort says it is aware of the situation and will work with the organisers of the event and nearby hotels on the call bookings. They added they will increase the number of taxis in the Marina Centre area.

It has been reported that some technical and maintenance crew at SICEC has been barred entry to their workplace for months. The reason was due to they have not received their passes from the organisers. An anonymous worker told the press that their passes had several problems on it. They were issued temporary passes earlier in September, but they have since expired. They were not let in without proper credentials. The workers who do not have passes have been given a day off from work, whereas the rest who had passes worked double to get ready for the meetings. An industry source stated that about 200 to 300 workers faced the same problem with their passes. The managing director from Showtec Corporation told the press around twenty of his crew were sent home as no pass have been issued to them, despite most of them submitted their forms a few months ago. A full strength of sixty is required to run the meetings. He added that a number of the passes did not come with an “S” at the bottom left hand corner of the card, which is a security feature for the person to be allowed into the Programme of Seminars which brings all the ministers and high-level delegates from 184 countries.

It has been reported shops at Suntec City Mall which is inside the convention centre have seen a drop in business from 30% to 70%, this came after the area was secured on Sunday night. Several restaurants saw no crowd at the restaurants, this also affected nearby Marina Square. Suntec City has also given promotions to its shoppers to attract shoppers, and special privileges have been given to the delegates for the meetings.

Annual meetings

13 September
Meetings and other events will officially commence on this day. 23,000 delegates had registered on this day to attend the meetings. The Singapore Changi Airport officially completes renovations at Terminal 2 after three years of upgrading. The IMF chief Rodrigo de Rato has criticised attempts made by the United States, People's Republic of China and some other nations to depress fuel prices, and advocated raising prices, instead of tax breaks or subsidies at the Organization of the Petroleum Exporting Countries seminar on the first day of the conference. He added that domestic pricing policies for refined fuel should reflect the scarcity of the resource, and high world crude oil prices. He acknowledged there would be some political resistance to raise the oil prices, but he mentioned successful experiences in Indonesia, Jordan and the United Arab Emirates. He called for adequate investment in the oil industry to ease concerns about oil supply in the later years, and appealed oil producing countries to balance the spending and savings for future generations. The IMF warned that the global markets faces a risk of a major setback, including an economic downturn in the United States, falling home prices, further surge in oil prices, interest rate rises to contain inflationary pressures, which the IMF said in its twice a year report on global financial stability.

14 September 
The inaugural Raffles Forum was held at Raffles City Convention Centre, with one plenary session on this day. At SSICEC, there was a World Economic Outlook meeting. The IMF predicted that the growth in the economy will increase, but there could be global imbalances.

15 September
United Kingdom's group of delegates arrived in Singapore, including Chancellor of the Exchequer as well as chairman of the International Monetary and Financial Committee Gordon Brown and Mervyn King, the Governor of the Bank of England. There were also press briefings by both the IMF and the World Bank Group. The police allowed the 22 out of the 27 banned activists into Singapore, after an appeal from the IMF/World Bank Group.

16 September
A one-day G7 finance ministers meeting is held at Raffles Hotel to discuss the world's economy. The three day Program of Seminars commences with 161 speakers at the event, attendees include private sector representatives, government delegates, civil society representatives and senior officials from the International Monetary Fund and the World Bank. Topics discussed include economic growth, the future of China and India, regional issues and faster economic growth of the Pacific Islands, ageing population in Asia, petrol prices, preventing a financial crisis, oil trade, poverty, trade agreements and other Asian issues.

People's Republic of China, though not a G7 industrialised nations member, is expected to loom large, with the minister and central bankers to press Beijing to further ease controls of the Renminbi. The agenda of the meeting is about what will be seen as dangerous imbalances in the global economy. The United States has run up massive accounts and budget deficits, export-led surpluses are developing in Asia. It also marks the debut to the G7 meetings, that is United States Treasury Secretary Henry Paulson, who was formerly the chairman and chief executive officer of Goldman Sachs. The United States wants the fight against terrorism and nuclear proliferation to be included on the agenda. The Program of Seminars opens on this day and runs for two days. The G24 ministers meeting will be held at SSICEC as well as the Program of Seminars.

17 September
The second day of the Program of Seminars began, and an International Monetary and Financial Committee (IMFC) meeting held. Press conferences of African finance ministers as well as Gordon Brown and de Rato were held at SSICEC. The World Bank announced that they will provide a US$15 million grant to combat bird flu in Indonesia. Seven lenders united and signed an agreement to combat corruption, these banks include the IMF and the World Bank. Also, CSOs discussed on several issues regarding daily issues.

18 September
Prime Minister Lee Hsien Loong and Senior Minister Goh Chok Tong attended the day's meetings. The Program of Seminars ends on this day and delegates discussed about the future of global economy, poverty and the future of Asia. Ministers of the members of the International Monetary Fund approved a plan to give more powers and voting rights to People's Republic of China, Mexico, South Korea and Turkey. This vote had 90.6% of the members supporting the move. However, the IMF remains dominated by Europe, the United States and Japan. China has less power in the IMF, although its economy is larger than Belgium and Netherlands combined. The IMF and World Bank have been criticised by Brazil, Argentina, Asian and African nations for prescribing severe belt-tightening measures during their economic crisis. The American government sees the reform of the IMF to redress global economic imbalances, which were cited as one of the biggest menaces to world growth. The IMF is stepping up in its financial surveillance through multilateral consultations to make it more effective and relevant. The World Bank president Paul Wolfowitz said that the poor should not be abandoned because their governments are weak, otherwise the people would be penalised twice. The IMF and World Bank see the need to combat corruption in developing countries. The World Bank will work with developing countries by working with countries or offered through projects on the countries itself. Wolfowitz said that the issue of governance is being addressed, and the most important thing is to take the principles in the paper, applying it in terms of budget allocation. Matters may be complicated due to lack of political will. He added that working with developing countries is a starting point and must work with banks, global organisations and other governments to stop corruption in their nations. African nations also called for more voting rights in the IMF for countries in their continent, at forums held in Africa itself.

19 September 
The plenary sessions commenced on this day with an opening ceremony hosted by Senior Minister Goh Chok Tong at Esplanade - Theatres on the Bay that night for some 5,000 official delegates with an official reception. The building was closed to public the entire day for the evening event. Several music and dance events were performed by several local arts groups. A buffet spread was also included in the opening ceremony. After a tour at the waterfront, the guests were led into the concert hall for "Diaspora", which is a mixed media production, combining music, video and drama of five Asian artists searching for their identities. The production itself was made by local arts company TheatreWorks, and it costs S$700,000 (US$437,500). The delegates sang praises of the production with one saying the music played by the orchestra is good, one of the stories told about the different cultures, ages and trying to find yourself, another said the production was colourful and diverse, with a lot of life in it. At the finale of the event, a ten-minute display of fireworks at the Marina Bay transformed the area into a multi-cultural street with segments of Chinatown and Little India.

At the plenary sessions, addresses were made by the chairman of the year's annual meetings, as well as the heads of the International Monetary Fund and the World Bank at SSICEC. The three parties stressed the need for the World Trade Organization's Doha Round talks to resume. Prime Minister Lee Hsien Loong said that the impasse in the Doha Round of trade negotiations carries a heavy cost and a high risk, and will extend beyond economics. Lee added that good governance is the key to help economies to open up in the era of globalisation and improve the lives for the people. He also outlined the roles of a good government in managing the process of changes. Lee said that governments must win the support of globalisation from the people and give them better opportunities. At the opening speech of IMF managing director Rodrigo de Rato said the world leaders must quickly revive the Doha Round of trade talks to prevent a damaging shift towards protectionism. De Rato also said that the world is having a period of high growth and low inflation unseen since the 1960s, and a solid growth in the economy could be expected in the following year. He added that the global growth cycle may turn and the best hope for good performance lies in further increase in international trade. The three risks to world economic prospects include rising oil prices, disorderly unwinding of global payments imbalances, and the prevention of trade. World Bank president Paul Wolfowitz told donor countries to increase aid to poor nations, and wealthy nations to put Africa as the top of the priority list of poverty fighting.

The IMF and World Bank heads agreed to do more for reform work in the system, including giving more powers to developing economies as they play a bigger role in the world's economy. The leaders warned the global growth cycle may change and further increases to international trade will guarantee an ensured performance. The IMF is trying to serve its members better and a Multilateral Consultation was to address global payment imbalances. The delegates paid tribute to Asia's economic growth and successes such as job creation and progress through private sector development as well as a good government.

20 September 
The event and the plenary sessions ended on this day, with the main achievement of member countries that they supported the IMF reform programme. The majority have also supported the second phase of reforms to revise the quota formula. The meeting was attended by 3,400 delegates. IMF managing director, de Rato was delighted with the overwhelming support of the support in the revision of quotas and the voice in the organisation. The IMF and the World Bank thanked the country for hosting the annual meetings, Mr De Rato mentioned that he had seems thousands of smiles from the Four Million Smiles campaign. He praised Singapore for not only being a city of enterprising people but also a city that makes strangers feel like friends.

Raffles Forum 
The inaugural Raffles Forum was held at Raffles City Convention Centre for a period of two days. The event was organised by the Lee Kuan Yew School of Public Policy and speakers include Minister Mentor Lee Kuan Yew, members of the school faculty, as well as other ministers, professors, economists, diplomats and chief executive officers.

Institute of International Finance meetings 
The Institute of International Finance meetings are being held at Shangri-La Hotel Singapore for a period of two days and an opening dinner will be organised for the IIF delegates.

List of venues 
 Suntec Singapore International Convention and Exhibition Centre (Main venue)
 City Hall (Registration)
 Esplanade - Theatres on the Bay (Official opening ceremony)
 The Pan Pacific Singapore (Seminars)
 Istana (Banquet for governors and spouses)
 Raffles Hotel (G8 meeting)
 Raffles City Convention Centre (Raffles Forum)
 Mount Faber (The Jewel Box; welcome tea for delegates' spouses)
 Asian Civilisations Museum, Empress Place (Lunch for governors spouses)
 Shangri-La Hotel Singapore (Institute of International Finance annual membership meeting and dinner)

Controversy
For the second time in the meetings' history (the first was Dubai 2003), outdoor demonstrations are outlawed due to Singapore laws banning outdoor protests and marches. Numerous appeals to the authorities to approve such protest were rejected as the government cited security reasons including potential terrorist threat. The authorities are also denying entries of accredited civil society representatives whom the police regards as "troublemakers", despite the IMF/World Bank appeals to the government to allow them to attend the meetings. Registered civil service organisations (CSO) may hold indoor demonstrations on the ground floor of Suntec Singapore outside Starbucks Coffee, within a 14 by 8 metre space boundary, but CSOs are disappointed with the arrangement. The CSO protests were supposed to start on 11 September, but the police has pushed the date to 13 September. The area is equipped with computers, printers and a conference room. ONE (Singapore) has produced videos for awareness of poverty throughout the world, and will be aired every ten minutes at the screens of convention centre. They are expected to protest on poverty and corruption, and how civil goods should respond to Jogjakarta and Aceh. It has been reported that one activist hopes to get global policy makers more attuned to the needs of youths when drafting policies. Thirty people from Global Call to Action Against Poverty wore white t-shirts gags with "no voice" written on them on 15 September. An activist from Action Aid International held a solo protest on 14 September, and her group staged a silent protest the day after. Some CSOs have accused the IMF/World Bank of deliberately choosing Singapore to host the meetings, because of its authoritarian reputation.

On 11 September, when civic activists began arriving in Singapore, 27 activists were denied entry and had to leave the country. The police explained that these people were involved in violent demonstrations, including breaking into the World Bank headquarters in Washington D.C. These individuals claimed that they had permission from the IMF and World Bank, but the police had stated that it is the local government's decision whether or not to allow them to enter the city state. Later, the World Bank and IMF accused the Singapore government of failing to allow the protestors into the country, with Paul Wolfowitz calling it a "going-back on an explicit agreement", saying that Singapore had signed an open-access agreement or the Memorandum of Understanding in 2003. The World Bank added that it is a "breach" of their agreement and they worked with them and also valued their role even when they disagree on their views. They were cleared by their home governments beforehand and the World Bank believed that all of them should not be excluded from the annual meetings. The organising committee told the press, they were looking into the matter at that point of time and later condemned the restrictions as "authoritarian". At that time, the Singapore police tried to contact the individuals via the World Bank or the embassies in Singapore, to prevent them from making a wasted trip to the country. On 15 September 2006, the Singapore government announced that they will allow 22 out of the 27 banned activists into the country after reviewing the list of activists whose entry was subject to an interview if they entered the city-state. The organising committee said it reviewed the input provided by the IMF and the World Bank earlier that morning. The Singapore Government said on 20 September 2006 that its decision to lift the ban on 22 activists came before the public statement by World Bank slamming it. In a letter carried in the Wall Street Journal Asia, Home Affairs Ministry corporate communications director Ong-Chew Peck Wan clarified the sequence of events. She wrote: 'In order to be as helpful as possible, Singapore reviewed the names whom the IMF and World Bank were prepared to vouch for and lifted the bans on 22 of them. We did this before the public statement by Mr Wolfowitz.' On another occasion, two Filipino activists were deported back to their country on 13 September as they were not accredited by the IMF/World Bank, and could post a security and public order threat. It was after interviews and full consideration of the circumstances. At 0700 (GMT +8) of 14 September, an Indian national was denied entry into the country, and has been deported by the police.

Some members of the Singapore opposition, including the Singapore Democratic Party, conducted a protest rally and march on 16 September 2006. The so-called Empower Singaporeans Rally and March was set to start at 11 am at the Speakers' Corner at Hong Lim Park but was refused to continue to other planned stops at Parliament House, Suntec City, and the Istana. On 11 September, it was reported that the police had started an investigation against these protest plans. The police reportedly had denied two applications for the planned peaceful protest and therefore confiscated leaflets that were handed out at Raffles City. Dr. Chee Soon Juan, of the Singapore Democratic Party, held a speech at Hong Lim Park. On 17 September, the protesters announced that they would continue their protest until Tuesday morning, 19 September, after Prime Minister Lee Hsien Loong's speech before the WB-IMF meeting.

Some organisations have decided to hold outdoor demonstrations in Batam, Indonesia instead, to circumvent the ban in Singapore. About 1,000 delegates were planning to protest there for a week with a final outdoor demonstration on 18 September. The Indonesian laws state that they were allowed to protest on the streets, if they informed the authorities three days beforehand. The authorities were reportedly lukewarm towards their proposed demonstrations and forum. A number of Indonesian NGOs took a half-page advertisement in a Batam newspaper voicing their opposition to the protests, arguing that the big gathering of NGO's activists would "undermine the investment climate on the island". On 6 September, the Batam police had sent a letter to the organisers that both their demonstration and forum would be banned. The police cited economic, political and security reasons for the ban, adding that other NGOs were not in favour of such protests. According to Indonesian officials, Batam police is helping to maintain the security during the meetings. Later, on 11 September, the Indonesian police granted a permit for a three-day protest forum in Batam, but there will still be no outdoor demonstrations.

Impact
A survey amongst delegates found a high satisfaction level with regards to the efficiency of event organisation, and of Singapore as a whole.

See also
 Annual Meetings of the International Monetary Fund and the World Bank Group
 Economy of Singapore
 Four Million Smiles

References

External links

 

Economic history of Singapore
World Bank
International Monetary Fund
2006 in Singapore
Diplomatic conferences in Singapore
21st-century diplomatic conferences
2006 in international relations